Middleborough High School is a public high school located in Middleborough, Massachusetts, established in 1873. The school is located at 71 East Grove Street. Middleborough High has an approximate student enrollment of 850 students in grades 9–12. The school's mascot is known as the "Sachem" and the school colors are black and orange.

See also
Pierce Academy

References

Educational institutions established in 1873
Middleborough, Massachusetts
Public high schools in Massachusetts
Schools in Plymouth County, Massachusetts
1873 establishments in Massachusetts